David Edward Williams (1847-1920) was the Archdeacon of St David's from 1900 until 1920.

Williams matriculated at Exeter College, Oxford in 1867, aged 19; he graduated B.A. and M.A. in 1874. He was ordained in 1877. After curacies in Carmarthen and Pembroke, he held incumbencies in Llanfrynach, Llawhaden and Llangyfelach.

References

Alumni of Exeter College, Oxford
Archdeacons of St Davids
Church in Wales archdeacons
19th-century Welsh Anglican priests
20th-century Welsh Anglican priests
People from the City of London
Deaths from pneumonia in Wales
1847 births
1920 deaths